"You're Gonna Hear from Me" is a song written by André Previn and Dory Previn written for the 1965 movie Inside Daisy Clover and performed, among others, by Andy Williams.  The song reached No. 13 on the adult contemporary chart in 1966.

Recordings
Stanley Turrentine recorded a version for his album 1966 album, The Spoiler.
Marilyn Maye recorded a version for her 1966 RCA Victor album, "The Lamp is Low."
Scott Walker recorded a version for his album 1967 album, Scott.
Eddie Palmieri recorded a version for his 1967 album, Molasses with Ismael Quintana on vocals
Frank Sinatra released a version on his 1966 album, That's Life.
Shirley Bassey released this song on her 1966 album, I've Got a Song for You.
Nancy Wilson - for her album A Touch of Today (1966)
Bill Evans recorded a version in 1967 and released on his 1982 album, California Here I Come.
Rosemary Clooney - for the album My Buddy (1983).
Barbra Streisand recorded a version for her 2003 album, The Movie Album.
Diana Ross & The Supremes recorded the song which remained unreleased until "Let the Music Play: Supreme Rarities" was issued in 2008
Pedro Ruy-Blas Spanish Jazz Singer in 2015 released a version of the song on his album "El Americano".
Bea Arthur performed the song on the TV show Maude in the 1976 episode "Tuckahoe Bicentennial".
Solea Pfeiffer performed the song to debut all-female orchestra The Broadway Sinfonietta.

References

Songs with music by André Previn
Songs with lyrics by Dory Previn
1966 singles
Andy Williams songs
Barbra Streisand songs
Frank Sinatra songs
Shirley Bassey songs
Columbia Records singles
Songs written for films
1965 songs